Atomyria is a genus of leaf beetles in the subfamily Eumolpinae. It is distributed in Central Asia and Iran. In 2012, the genus was moved from the tribe Bromiini to the tribe Nodinini (now known as Typophorini). In 2020, the genus was revised by A. G. Moseyko, who described a new species and transferred two species to Chloropterus, leaving only two valid species remaining within Atomyria.

Members of the genus inhabit tugai forests. The known distribution of Atomyria also corresponds very closely with the distribution of the desert shrub genus Tamarix.

Species
Atomyria includes only two valid species:
 Atomyria kermanshahica Moseyko, 2020 – Iran (Kermanshah Province)
 Atomyria sarafschanica (Solsky, 1881) – Kazakhstan, Kyrgyzstan, Tajikistan, Turkmenistan, Uzbekistan

The following species were formerly included, but have since been transferred to the genus Chloropterus.
 Atomyria mateui Selman, 1969 – Algeria
 Atomyria persica (Baly, 1878) – Iran

References

Eumolpinae
Chrysomelidae genera
Beetles of Asia
Taxa named by Georgiy Jacobson